Lobophytum pygmapedium is a species of soft corals in the genus Lobophytum.

References 

Alcyoniidae
Animals described in 1984